Kath Hempenstall (born 20 September 1988) is an Australian cricket coach and former player. She played for the Perth Scorchers in the Women's Big Bash League (WBBL). She played in two matches for the team in the 2019–20 Women's Big Bash League season.

In 2021, Hempenstall was appointed head coach of the Papua New Guinea women's national cricket team.

References

1988 births
Living people
Australian women cricketers
Perth Scorchers (WBBL) cricketers
Place of birth missing (living people)
Australian cricket coaches
Australian expatriates in Papua New Guinea